The scaled fruiteater (Ampelioides tschudii) is a species of bird in the family Cotingidae. It is the only member of the genus Ampelioides.

It is found in Bolivia, Colombia, Ecuador, Peru, and Venezuela, where its natural habitat is subtropical or tropical moist montane forests.

References

scaled fruiteater
Birds of the Northern Andes
scaled fruiteater
scaled fruiteater
Taxonomy articles created by Polbot